William Pitt Durfee (5 February 1855 – 17 December 1941) was an American mathematician who introduced Durfee squares. He was a student of James Sylvester, and after obtaining his degree in 1883 he became a professor at Hobart college in 1884 and became dean in 1888. Durfee House and Durfee Hall are named in his honor.

Publications

References

Who Was Who in America: with World Notables. Volume 1, by Marquis Who's Who, 1942.

External links
Biography on HWS website
Durfee House on HWS website

1855 births
1941 deaths
University of Michigan alumni
Johns Hopkins University alumni
19th-century American mathematicians
20th-century American mathematicians
People from Livonia, Michigan
People from Geneva, New York
Mathematicians from Michigan
Mathematicians from New York (state)